Charles Stewart (8 May 1860 – 25 February 1890) was a Scotland international rugby union player.

Rugby Union career

Amateur career

He played for West of Scotland.

Provincial career

He played in the inter-city match for Glasgow District in December 1879.

He played for West of Scotland District in February 1880.

International career

He was capped twice for Scotland in 1880.

References

1860 births
1890 deaths
Scottish rugby union players
Scotland international rugby union players
West of Scotland District (rugby union) players
Glasgow District (rugby union) players
Rugby union players from Glasgow
West of Scotland FC players
Rugby union forwards